All Fates Have Changed is the solo debut album by underground rapper Jus Allah, formerly of the groups Jedi Mind Tricks & Army of the Pharaohs. The album was released June 7, 2005 under Babygrande Records. The album came five years after his recording debut, on JMT's Violent by Design. Guest appearances on the album are provided by GZA, Chief Kamachi, Lord Jamar, Shabazz the Disciple, Agallah, Virtuoso, T-Ruckus, Evil Dead and Bomshot. The album features the singles "G-O-D" b/w "Supreme" and "Pool of Blood" b/w "Hell Razors". The last five tracks on the album are all previously released 'Bonus Tracks & Alternate Mixes'. "White Nightmare" and "Reign of the Lord" were originally released on Jus' "White Nightmare" single, "Severed and Split" and "Chess King" were both featured on the Omnipotent Records compilation Era of the Titans, and "Divide & Conquer", produced by Molemen member Panik, was featured on the Molemen compilation Lost Sessions.

Track listing

References

Babygrande Records albums
2005 albums
Hip hop albums by American artists